Tolype laricis, known generally as the larch tolype or larch lappet moth, is a species in the moth family Lasiocampidae found in eastern North America.

The MONA or Hodges number for Tolype laricis is 7673.

References

Further reading

External links

 

Lasiocampidae